Edward Kleinschmidt Mayes born 29 October 1951 is an American poet and writer.

Mayes' books of poetry include First Language, To Remain, Magnetism, Works and Days, Speed of Life, and Bodysong.

His poems have appeared in American Poetry Review, Gettysburg Review, Iowa Review, Massachusetts Review, New England Review, The New Yorker, Poetry, TriQuarterly, Virginia Quarterly Review, and the Best American Poetry.

His books have received the Juniper Prize, the Gesù Award, the Bay Area Book Reviewers Association Award, and the Associated Writing Programs Prize.  He's also received the Cecil Hemley Memorial Award and the Gordon Barber Memorial Award from the Poetry Society of America, and a National Endowment for the Arts Fellowship in Poetry.

Mayes lives in North Carolina and Cortona, Italy, with his wife, writer Frances Mayes.

References

American male poets
Living people
Year of birth missing (living people)